Yeso Creek is a stream in De Baca County, New Mexico, in the United States.

Yeso is a name derived from the Spanish language meaning "gypsum".

See also
List of rivers of New Mexico

References

Rivers of De Baca County, New Mexico
Rivers of New Mexico